Sayyid Abdul-Nabi Mousavi Fard (Persian: سید عبدالنبی موسوی فرد) (born 1956, Jahrom, grew-up in Khorramshahr) is an Iranian Twelver Shi'a cleric, who has been recently appointed as the representative of Wali-Faqih (Guardianship of the Islamic Jurist) in Khuzestan province and likewise as the Imam of Friday Prayer of Ahwaz by the order of Sayyid Ali Khamenei, the supreme leader of Iran, on 30 April 2019.

Mousavi Fard who is also known as "Hujjatul-Islam Mousavi Fard", went to Qom after Iran-Iraq war (in order to pass his seminary courses). This Shia cleric was previously the Imam of Friday Prayer in the cities of Ramhormoz (for five years) and Khorramshahr in Khuzestan. Afterwards, Seyyed Ali Khamenei appointed him as Wali-Faqih representative in Khuzestan and also Ahwaz Imam Jom'a after the resignation of Seyyed Mohammad Ali Mousavi Jazayeri (on 15 February 2019, due to physical weakness) who was running in these positions before.

References 

Representatives of the Supreme Leader in the Provinces of Iran
Iranian ayatollahs
1956 births
Living people
People from Jahrom